Kashaya (also Southwestern Pomo, Kashia) is the critically endangered language of the Kashia band of the Pomo people.  The Pomoan languages have been classified as part of the Hokan language family (although the status of Hokan itself is controversial).  The name Kashaya corresponds to words in neighboring languages with meanings such as "skillful" and "expert gambler".  It is spoken by the Kashia Band of Pomo Indians of the Stewarts Point Rancheria.

Phonology

Vowels 
Kashaya has five vowels, which all occur as short and long. In the orthography established by Robert Oswalt, long vowels are represented by a raised dot (ꞏ).

Vowel length is contrastive in pairs such as  "bone" versus  "wind", and  "hill, mountain" versus  "uphill".

Consonants
Kashaya has the consonants shown in the chart below, following the transcription style established by Oswalt (1961). The letter c represents the affricate , which patterns phonologically as a palatal stop. The coronal stops differ not so much in the location of the contact against the top of the mouth as in the configuration of the tongue. The alveolar stop ṭ is an apical articulation, more precisely . For younger speakers it resembles the English t in position.

The consonants  occur only in loanwords; due to the influence of English, loans from Spanish and Russian receive a pronunciation of  like that in American English.

Syllable structure
In the normal case, every syllable requires a single onset consonant; no onset clusters are permitted. In most contexts, the rhyme consists of a vowel that may be long or followed by a single consonant in the coda, resulting in the possible syllables CV, CV꞉, and CVC. Examples of these structures are  "coyote",  "is running (non-final)", and  "to bow".

A few loanwords do have an onset cluster, such as  "bridle" and  "stove" (from Spanish). Loans may also have superheavy CV꞉C syllables, since stressed vowels in the source language are typically borrowed with a long vowel:  "match",  "fault",  "brick" (Spanish , ; Russian  "oven"). An exceptional word with CVCC is  "gnat".

Superheavy CV꞉C and CVCC syllables are well attested word-finally in specific verb forms. For example, the Suppositional suffix  can be final as in  yielding  "he must have run down". More typically a superheavy syllable occurs when the rightmost suffix is one of several evidential suffixes containing an  vowel that deletes when no other suffix follows, such as the Circumstantial  in  "he must have drowned" and the Visual  in  "I saw it run in".

Stress
The determination of stress is quite complex and the main stress can fall on any of the first five syllables in a phrase, depending on various factors. According to the analysis in Buckley (1994), iambs are constructed from left to right and the leftmost foot generally receives the main stress:  "I ran in",  "he is peeking in there". Non-initial feet do not receive secondary stress but lead to lengthening of vowels in open syllables (which however does not apply to word-final vowels nor to a large set of suffixes occurring toward the end of the word). The initial syllable is extrametrical unless the word begins with a monosyllabic root, as in the case of  "run". For example, the footing in  "start to cut downward" with the root  "cut" skips the first syllable, while in  "keep running all the way around" this is blocked by the short root  "run".

The pattern is further complicated when the first foot begins on a syllable that has a long vowel, as in  "tell". If the following syllable is closed, the stress shifts to the foot that contains that syllable:  "cause to bring a message out here". If the long vowel is followed by a CV syllable, i.e. if the initial sequence to be footed is CV꞉CV, the length moves rightward to create CVCV꞉ and the stress similarly shifts to the next foot:  "bring a message out!".  Combined with extrametricality, this can lead to stress as far in as the fifth syllable:  "always be too shy" from the root  "be shy"; this verb forms a minimal pair with  "gather", which lacks stress shift in  "always gather".

While iambic lengthening is determined by footing within a word, stress can be reassigned at the phrasal level across word boundaries:  "be good!" where  is the adjective "good" and the remainder is the imperative verb.

Phonological processes
A large number of processes affect the realization of underlying sounds in Kashaya. A representative sample is given here.
 The glottalized nasals  surface unchanged in the syllable coda, but change to voiced stops  in the onset: cf. the root  "see, look" in  "if he sees" and  "look!".
 The default vowel  changes to  after , and to  after  (from underlying ): cf. the imperative  in  "limp!",  "punch him!",  "look!".
 Any vowel changes to /a/ after a uvular: /ʔusaq-in/ →  "while washing the face", /sima꞉q-eti/ →  "although he's asleep".
 Plain stops are aspirated in the coda: /da-hyut-meʔ/ →  "break it!" (formal imperative); cf. /da-hyut-i/ →  "break it!" (informal).
 A uvular stop in the coda generally loses its place of articulation: /sima꞉q-ti/ →  "about to fall asleep". Exceptions exist before certain suffixes and in loanwords such as  "dress" (from Alutiiq). Debuccalization of other stops occurs in various contexts as well.
 An aspirated stop in a prefix dissimilates from an /h/ or an aspirated stop at the beginning of the root, similar to Grassmann's Law: cf. the prefix /pʰu/ "by blowing" with aspiration in  "be blown along" but without it in  "a windbreak".

Morphology

Kashaya can be classified as a polysynthetic language; it is primarily suffixing but has an important set of instrumental prefixes on verbs.

Nouns

Noun morphology is modest. The main examples are prefixes that mark possession of kinship terms. The first person has several allomorphs including the prefix  and CV꞉ reduplication; the latter is informal and is associated with phonologically less marked stems, no doubt derived historically from child pronunciations. These prefixes occur with the suffixes ,  depending on the stem and prefix. Examples with /qa/ "grandmother" are  "your ~",  "his/her/their ~", and informal  "my grandma", based on /ka/ simplified from /qa/.

Verbs

Verbs take a great variety of suffixes divided into many position classes. There are also instrumental prefixes that figure crucially in the use of many verb stems.

Position classes

Oswalt (1961) identifies the following position classes; it can be seen that there is far more complexity in the set of suffixes than in the prefixes.

 Prefixes
 A — Instrumental
 B — Plural Act
 Root
 Inner Group Suffixes
 I — Plural Agent
 II — Reduplication
 III — Essive, Terrestrial
 IV — Semelfactive, Inceptive, Plural Act, Plural Movement
 Middle Group Suffixes
 Va — Directionals
 Vb — Directionals/Inceptives
 VI — Reflexive, Reciprocal
 VII — Causative
 VIII — Locomotory
 IX — Durative
 X — Distributive
 Outer Group Suffixes
 XI — Defunctive
 XII — Negative
 XIII — First Person Object, Remote Past, Inferential
 XIV — Evidentials, Modals, Imperatives, Futures, Absolutive, Adverbializers
 XVv — Nonfinal Verb, Responsive, Interrogative
 XVn — Subjective, Objective
 XVb — Explanatory

Only a few of the most important categories can be illustrated here.

Instrumental prefixes

Many verbs cannot occur without a prefix that provides information about the manner of the action described. These 20 instrumental prefixes, all of the shape CV, are the following.

 ba- "with the lips, snout, or beak; by speech (or hearing)"
 bi- "by encircling, e.g. with the arms; by sewing, eating (esp. with a spoon)"
 ca- "with the rear end, a massive or bulky object, a knife"
 cu- "with a round object, flowing water, the front end; by shooting"
 cʰi- "by holding a small part of a larger object, e.g. a handle"
 da- "with the hand (palm), paw; by waves"
 du- "with the finger"
 di- "by gravity, falling, a heavy weight"
 ha- "with a swinging motion"
 hi- "with the body"
 ma- "with the sole of the foot, claws, the butt of the hand"
 mi- "with the small end of a long object, the toes, nose; by kicking, smelling, counting, reading"
 mu- "with a quick movement, heat, light, mind or emotions"
 pʰa- "with the end of a long object, the fist; by wrapping"
 pʰi- "with the side of a long object, the eyes, an ax, a hammer"
 pʰu- "by blowing"
 qa- "between forces: with the teeth, by chewing, eating"
 si- "by water: wetting, dissolving, slipping, floating, rain, tongue"
 ša- "by a long object moving lengthwise; with a mesh"
 šu- "by pulling, pushing and pulling; with a long flexible object"

For example, the root /hcʰa/ "knock over" can occur unprefixed as "fall over" where no agency is indicated, but is typically prefixed to expand upon the meaning:  "knock over with snout",  "throw someone in wrestling",  "knock over by backing into",  "push over with the hand",  "push over with the finger",  "be knocked over by a falling object", etc.

Suffixes

A sampling of verb suffixes:

 Directionals include -ad "along, here", -mul "around", -mad "in an enclosed or defined place", -aq "out from here; north or west from here".
 Directionals/Inceptives -ala "down" and -ibic "up, away" also mark the beginning of an action.
 Causative -hqa.
 Durative -ad with many other allomorphs, such as -id, -cid, -med, depending on the preceding segment and the length of the stem.
 Evidentials include quotative -do, circumstantial -qa, and visual -ya. The /a/ of the evidentials deletes when no other suffix follows.
 Absolutive -w after vowels, -u after /d/, and -ʔ after other consonants.

Position class XIV (Evidentials, Modals, Imperatives, Futures, Absolutive, Adverbializers) represents the largest set of suffixes and is the only slot that is obligatorily filled in every verb.

A few examples of verbs with many affixes, the root shown in bold:
 pʰa-ʔdi-c-á꞉d-ala-w "to poke with the end of a stick while moving downhill"
 cʰi-ʔdí-ccicʼ-a꞉dad-u "to walk along picking up things and pulling them close to oneself"
 nohpʰo-yíʔ-ciʔ-do "it's said that those former people used to live (like that)"

Syntax

The basic word order of Kashaya is quite flexible in main clauses; however, the default location for the verb is final, and this position is required in subordinate clauses. A notable feature is that when a verb does occur in non-final position, depending on other suffixes present it takes the Nonfinal Verb ending -e꞉. Some possible orders are illustrated here with the simple sentence "I see that dog", containing the elements ʔa "I (subj)", mul "that (obj)", hayu "dog", canʼ- "see".
 hayu mul ʔa canʼ
 hayu ʔa mul canʼ
 hayu ʔa cade꞉ mul
 cade꞉ ʔa hayu mul
Oswalt (1961) reports that younger speakers tend to favor the SVO order typical of English.

Case marking

The most important case markers are subjective and objective case. (Others are the vocative and comitative, of more limited application.) Most nouns are marked with the subjective ʔem or the objective ʔel; these are morphologically complex and contain the actual case markers /m/ and /l/, found with verbal expressions. 
 ʔacacʼ em ʔima꞉ta ʔél cadu — "the man (ʔacac) sees the woman (ʔima꞉ta)"
 ʔahca qáwiwa-l cadé꞉ ʔa — "I see the house (ʔahca) he is building (qawiwa-)"
Personal names take the suffix -to in the objective case, zero in the subjective.

Pronouns have distinct forms in subjective and objective case; the forms are not easily analyzed but the objective case generally ends in -(a)l or -to.

Demonstratives are also distinguished for case; they are given here as subjective/objective:
 mu(꞉) / mul — "that, this, it, those, these, they (vague demonstrative or anaphoric reference)"
 maʔu / maʔal — "this, these (the closer object)"
 haʔu / haʔal — "that, those (the further object)"

Switch reference

Switch reference refers to markings according to whether a subordinate
verb has the same or different subject as the main verb. In Kashaya it also marks whether the time of the
action is the same, or preceding the main verb action in the
past or future. There is no consistent expression of
these categories except for the element /pʰi/ in both future
suffixes, but the remaining /la/ is not identifiable as a separate suffix.

The suffix containing /li/ is realized as -wli after vowels, -u꞉li (or /uwli/) after d, and -ʔli after other consonants; this allomorphy is related to that of the very common Absolutive suffix, -w, -u, -ʔ.  A few examples of these morphemes:

 tʼeti꞉bícʰ-pʰi maya miyícʼkʰe — "you should stand up and (then) speak" [same subject, future tense]
 pʰala cóhtoʔ, duwecí꞉d-em — "he left again as night was falling" [different subject, simultaneous]
 cohtóʔ da꞉qacʼ-ba cohtó꞉y — "having wanting to go, he went" [same subject, past tense]
 ʔama: qʰaʔa꞉dú-ʔli, cohtoʔ — "after morning had come, she left" [different subject, past tense]; consonant-final stem /qʰaʔa-aduc/

Notable Kashaya Pomo speakers 
 Pomo speaker Langford "Lanny" Roger Pinola (April 25, 1938 – April 21, 2003) lived on the Kashaya Reservation until age six.
 Essie Pinola Parrish (1902–1979), a noted basketweaver, educated Kashaya children in the language, and "compiled a Kashaya Pomo dictionary, working with Robert Oswalt, a Berkeley scholar well-known in the field of Indian linguistics."

See also
 Pomoan languages
 Pomo people
 Fort Ross

Notes

References
 Buckley, Eugene (1994). Theoretical aspects of Kashaya phonology and morphology. CSLI Publications, Stanford University.
 
 McLendon, Sally. (2003). Evidentials in Eastern Pomo with a comparative survey of the category in other Pomoan languages. In A. Y. Aikhenvald & R. M. W. Dixon (Eds.), Studies in evidentiality(pp. 101–129). Typological studies in language (Vol. 54). Amsterdam: John Benjamins Publishing Company. ; .
 Mithun, Marianne. (1999). The languages of Native North America. Cambridge: Cambridge University Press.  (hbk); .
 Oswalt, Robert L. (1961). A Kashaya grammar (Southwestern Pomo), PhD dissertation, University of California, Berkeley.

External links
Collection of Kashaya resources compiled by the University of Pennsylvania 
Kashaya dictionary
Kashaya language overview at the Survey of California and Other Indian Languages
 Kashaya basic lexicon at the Global Lexicostatistical Database
 OLAC resources in and about the Kashaya language

Pomo tribe
Indigenous languages of California
Endangered Pomoan languages
Pomoan languages
History of Sonoma County, California